A vitamin is an organic compound and a vital nutrient that an organism requires in limited amounts.

Vitamin may also refer to:

 Vitamin (TV series)
 Vitamins A(short story)
 Vitamin (Andrea song)
 Vitamins (Music for Dead Birds album)